Margyricarpus is a genus of flowering plant in the family Rosaceae, native to South America.

Taxonomy
The genus was first described by Hipólito Ruiz López and José Antonio Pavón Jiménez in 1794. It is placed in the subtribe Sanguisorbinae.

Species
, Plants of the World Online accepted the following species:
Margyricarpus digynus (Bitter) Skottsb.
Margyricarpus pinnatus (Lam.) Kuntze

References

Sanguisorbinae
Rosaceae genera